Soteska pri Moravčah is a settlement north of Moravče in central Slovenia. The area is part of the traditional region of Upper Carniola. It is now included with the rest of the municipality in the Central Slovenia Statistical Region.

Name
Soteska pri Moravčah was attested in historical sources as Sotosk in 1328, Zotesk in 1332, Sotesken in 1341, and Satteskch in 1405, among other spellings. The name of the settlement was changed from Soteska to Soteska pri Moravčah in 1953.

References

External links
 
Soteska pri Moravčah on Geopedia

Populated places in the Municipality of Moravče